Choi Yang-do is a South Korean agricultural biotechnologist. His research focuses on the development of crops with stress-tolerant and yield-enhancing traits. One of his academic achievements is the discovery of a new jasmonate which enhances resistance against external stress of the crop. Choi is currently professor at Seoul National University in South Korea.

Biography 
Choi Yang-do was born in Seoul, South Korea. He studied agricultural chemistry at Seoul National University (1972-1976) and graduated with a BS degree. From 1976 to 1978 he received a MS degree in biological science from Korea Advanced Institute of Science and Technology (KAIST) and earned 
his Ph.D. in biochemistry, molecular biology and cell biology from 1981 to 1985 at Northwestern University in Evanston.

Researches 
Choi researched jasmonates, which are believed to participate in signal transduction processes between external stresses, such as wounding, pathogenic attack, or cell response by activating the defense genes. He discovered a new enzyme, (EC2.1.1.141) jasmonate carboxyl methyltransferase (JMT), which catalyzes the methylation of jasmonate to MeJA. The overexpression of the JMT gene confers resistance to pathogens. He is currently working to understand the molecular function of MeJA, JMT, and its effector genes. Furthermore, the genetic engineering of crops by application of those genes and knowledge is under investigation.

The major research activity is the discovery of a novel enzyme and its genes encoding jasmonic acid carboxyl methyltransferase, which is involved in stress response and signal transduction in plant. Other achievements are the development of drought tolerant transgenic rice and transferred technology to Mahyco, India and the development of yield-enhanced transgenic rice and transferred technologies to BASF Plant Science in Germany.

Awards
For his scientific achievements Choi received the New Technology Development Award from the Ministry of Science & Technology (1992), the Special Award from Korean Society for Molecular & Cell Biology from the Korean Society of Molecular and Cellular Biology (1999), the 11th Sangrok Agriculture & Life Science Award from Seoul National University College of Agriculture (2002), the Excellent Monograph Award from the Korean Federation for Science & Technology Societies (2003), the 11th Hwanong Award from Hwanong Academy & Research Foundation (2004), the KSABC Award from the Korean Society for Applied Biology and Chemistry (2006), the 52nd NAS Award from the National Academy of Sciences, and the Most Outstanding Korean Scientist and Engineer Award from the Ministry of Education, Science and Technology & Korean Federation of Science and Technology Societies (2008).

References
Choi YD et al. Plants having enhanced yield-related traits and a method for making the same. at the stage of national entry : WO 2007/144190; WO 2008/104598; WO 2008/142163; WO 2009/016104; WO 2009/016232; WO 2010/124953; WO/2011/036232; WO/2011/003800  
Lee, J. S., D. K. Lee, J. H. Ahn, S. K. Song and Y. D. Choi. Root-specific expansin gene regulating root growth and obstacle-touching stress resistance in the plant. US Patent US 7,217,861 B2.
Kim, J., B. H. Nahm, Y, D. Choi, I. C. Jang, W. B. Choi, Y. S. Kim, C. H.  Kim, and S. I. Song. Method for increasing an abiotic-resistance in monocot plant. WO 2004/000008

21st-century biologists
South Korean biotechnologists
Biochemists
South Korean biologists
South Korean chemists
Academic staff of Seoul National University
Seoul National University alumni
Living people
1953 births